ISO 22381:2018  Security and resilience – Authenticity, integrity and trust for products and documents – Guidelines for establishing interoperability among object identification systems to deter counterfeiting and illicit trade, is an international standard developed by ISO/TC 292 Security and resilience and published by the International Organization for Standardization in 2018.
ISO 22381 is a guidance document that provides various of recommendations for establishing interoperability among independently functioning product identification and related authentication systems, as described in ISO 16678.

Scope and contents 
ISO 22381 includes the following main clauses: 
 Scope
 Normative references
 Terms and definitions
 Abbreviated terms 
 Planning, implementing and controlling systems’ interoperability 
 5.1 Identify stakeholders and their needs  
 5.2 Organize stakeholders  
 5.3 Plan architecture  
 5.4 Plan and implement operations  
 5.5 Review and improve 
Annex A Typical stakeholder interests in an I-OP 
Annex B The role of trusted entry points for user groups 
Annex C Types of information exchanged in I-OP architectures

Related standards
ISO 22381 is part a series of documents on Authenticity, integrity and trust for products and documents, including  
 ISO 22380:2018 Security and resilience – Authenticity, integrity and trust for products and documents – General principles for product fraud risk
 ISO 22382:2018 Security and resilience – Authenticity, integrity and trust for products and documents – Guidelines for the content, security and issuance of excise tax stamps
 ISO 12931:2012 Performance criteria for authentication solutions used to combat counterfeiting of material goods
 ISO 16678:2014 Guidelines for interoperable object identification and related authentication systems to deter counterfeiting and illicit trade

History 
ISO 22381 was first being developed in ISO/TC 247 Fraud countermeasures and controls under the number ISO 20229. The standard got a new number when ISO/TC 247 was merged into ISO/TC 292 in 2015.

See also 
 List of ISO standards
 International Organization for Standardization

References

External links 
 ISO 22381— Security and resilience – Authenticity, integrity and trust for products and documents – Guidelines for establishing interoperability among object identification systems to deter counterfeiting and illicit trade
 ISO TC 292— Security and resilience
 ISO 22381  at www.isotc292online.org

22381